Thomas Carew (1526/7–12 February 1565) was an English lawyer and  politician who sat in the House of Commons  between 1555 and 1565.

Carew was the son of Sir Wymond Carew of East Anthony Cornwall. He matriculated from St John's College, Cambridge in Autumn 1548. He was admitted at the Inner Temple in November 1550.

In 1555, Carew was elected Member of Parliament for Plymouth. He was elected MP for Saltash in 1563.

He married Elizabeth, the daughter of Sir Richard Edgecombe of Mount Edgcumbe and Cotehele, Cornwall. They had three sons, including Richard and George, and a one daughter.

References

1527 births
1565 deaths
Members of the Parliament of England for Saltash
Thomas
Members of the Parliament of England for Plymouth
Alumni of St John's College, Cambridge
English MPs 1555
English MPs 1563–1567